"Kiss Me" is a song by Australian pop group Indecent Obsession. It was released as their first single from their second studio album, Indio (1992). The song peaked at number 27 on the ARIA Chart.

Track listing
 7" (MCS 17876)
 "Kiss Me" - 4:35
 "Mystery" - 3:42

 Maxi (MCD 17877)
 "Kiss Me" - 4:35
 "Kiss Me" (Extended Version) - 6:13
 "Mystery" - 3:42

Chart performance

References

External links
 "Kiss Me" by Indecent Obsession"

Songs about kissing
1992 songs
1992 singles
Indecent Obsession songs